Bernard Bell may refer to:

 Bernard P. Bell (1911–1971), American Medal of Honor recipient
 Bernard Bell (attorney) (fl. 1990s), American attorney and legal scholar
 Bernard Iddings Bell (1886–1958), American Christian author, priest and cultural commentator